Madar is an album by Norwegian saxophonist Jan Garbarek featuring Tunisian oud player Anouar Brahem and Pakistani tabla master Ustad Shaukat Hussain recorded in 1992 and released on the ECM label in 1994.

Reception
The Allmusic review by Scott Yanow awarded the album 3 stars stating "It may take some time for listeners to get into this music and notice the fire beneath the ice but the close communication between the players is apparent from the start. Jan Garbarek has succeeded in carving out his own unique niche in improvised music and Madar is a good example of how he can create a great deal out of what seems like very little"

Track listing 
All compositions by Anouar Brahem except as indicated
 "Sull Lull" (Traditional) - 16:51 
 "Madar" (Anouar Brahem, Jan Garbarek) - 11:14 
 "Sebika" - 5:32 
 "Bahia" - 10:20 
 "Ramy" - 3:00 
 "Jaw" (Ustad Shaukat Hussain) - 8:04 
 "Joron" (Traditional) - 6:29 
 "Qaws" (Brahem, Garbarek) - 15:12 
 "Epilogue" - 0:52

Personnel 
 Jan Garbarek - soprano saxophone, tenor saxophone
 Anouar Brahem - oud
 Ustad Shaukat Hussain - tabla

References 

1994 albums
ECM Records albums
Jan Garbarek albums
Anouar Brahem albums
Albums produced by Manfred Eicher